is a railway station on the Fujikyuko Line in the city of Tsuru, Yamanashi, Japan, operated by Fuji Kyuko (Fujikyu).

Lines

Station layout
The station is staffed and consists of a single side platform serving a single bidirectional track, with the station building located on the south side of the track. It has a waiting room and toilet facilities.

Adjacent stations

History
Tsurubunkadaigakumae Station opened on 16 November 2004.

Surrounding area
 Tsuru University (after which the station is named)
 Tsuru Municipal Athletic Park
 Uguisu Hall

References

External links

 Fujikyuko station information 

Railway stations in Yamanashi Prefecture
Railway stations in Japan opened in 2004
Stations of Fuji Kyuko
Railway stations in Japan opened in 1929
Tsuru, Yamanashi